Eloise Rafia "Ella" Haddad (born 1 February 1978) is an Australian politician.  She was elected to the Tasmanian House of Assembly for the Labor Party in the Division of Denison at the 2018 state election, and is currently the member for Clark after Denison was renamed.

Haddad graduated with degrees in arts and law from the University of Tasmania and then worked for Duncan Kerr , the federal member for Denison. Haddad also worked for several Labor members of the Tasmanian Parliament as a legal and policy adviser. These included roles in the offices of former Attorneys-General of Tasmania, Judy Jackson and her successor, Steve Kons, Lisa Singh when she was a member of the Tasmanian Parliament, and Rebecca White MP. She has served as Secretary of the Tasmanian Branch of the International Commission of Jurists, including participating in international conferences. Haddad has also served as President of the Tasmanian branch of the Fabian Society, a left wing think tank researching progressive political ideas and public policy reform. Haddad commenced further study as a postgraduate student at the University of Tasmania. After serving in political advisory roles for many years, Haddad left politics for a while, moving to the Tasmanian community sector and health sector. Haddad worked as a policy and research officer at the Alcohol, Tobacco and Other Drugs Council of Tasmania . Her work there focused on the stigma and discrimination faced by people accessing drug and alcohol treatment services.

Haddad served on the boards of several Tasmanian community organisations over many years including the Tasmanian Council of Social Services (TasCOSS), Women's Health Tasmania (then Hobart Women's Health Centre), TasCAHRD, TasDeaf and Ten Lives Cat Centre (then the Hobart Cat Centre).

Since Haddad entered Parliament she has been known to champion progressive policy. As Shadow-Attorney General in 2018, she drafted legislation to improve recognition and respect of transgender rights in the State, including removing laws that forced transgender Tasmanians to undergo invasive reassignment surgery before being able to have the gender marker on their birth certificate.

References

External links

1978 births
Living people
Australian Labor Party members of the Parliament of Tasmania
Members of the Tasmanian House of Assembly
Women members of the Tasmanian House of Assembly
21st-century Australian politicians
21st-century Australian women politicians
University of Tasmania alumni
Australian women lawyers